Scouts Inc. is a partner of ESPN Inc. that specializes in scouting and evaluating current and future players and teams in professional, college and high school sports. The content is provided on the ESPN television networks, ESPN Radio and ESPN internet sites.

Personalities
 Mel Kiper Jr. - NFL and College football
 Todd McShay - NFL and College football
 Dean Dalton - NFL
 Gary Horton - NFL
 Doug Kretz - NFL
 Ken Moll - NFL
 Matt Williamson - NFL
 David Thorpe - NBA and College basketball
 Tom Luginbill - National high school recruiting and college football

See also
ESPN.com
ESPN

References

External links
 

ESPN media outlets
S